John Faris may refer to:

John D. Faris (born 1951), Maronite Catholic priest
John Thomson Faris (1871–1949), American editor, author, and clergyman